This is a list of women artists who were born in Armenia or whose artworks are closely associated with that country.

A
Lusik Aguletsi (1946–2018), Soviet Armenian painter
Maide Arel (1907–1997), Turkish-born Armenian cubist painter
Mariam Aslamazyan (1907–2006), painter
Eranuhi Aslamazyan (1910–1998), painter

B
Sonia Balassanian (born 1942), painter, sculptor, installation artist, curator
Zabelle C. Boyajian (1873–1957), painter, writer
Lavinia Bazhbeuk-Melikyan (1922–2005), Soviet-Armenian painter
Zuleika Bazhbeuk-Melikyan (born 1939), painter
Zabelle C. Boyajian (1873–1957), painter and writer

C
 Tatev Chakhian (born 1992), Armenian-born Polish visual artist, poet

D 
 Nelly Danielyan (born 1978), painter

G
Ada Gabrielyan (born 1941), painter
 Nona Gabrielyan (born 1944), Armenian-born German sculptor and educator
Mari Gerekmezyan (1913–1947), Armenian-Turkish sculptor
Regina Ghazaryan (1915–1999), painter
Stella Grigoryan (born 1989), sculptor

H
Mariam Hakobyan (born 1949), sculptor

K
Armine Kalents (1920–2007), painter
Jackie Kazarian, American painter, video artist, and installation artist of Armenian descent
Gayane Khachaturian (1942–2009), Georgian-Armenian painter, graphic artist

M
Hripsime Margaryan (born 1975), painter, sculptor
Armenouhi Martirosyan (born 1961), painter
Margarita Matulyan (born 1985), painter
Tereza Mirzoyan (1922–2016), sculptor
Varteni Mosdichian (born 1953), Boston-based Armenian artist, educator
Alina Mnatsakanian (born 1958), Iranian-Armenian Switzerland-based visual artist

N
Arpenik Nalbandyan (1916–1964), Soviet-Armenian painter

S
Hripsime Simonyan (1916–1998), sculptor, ceramist, decorative artist
Nune Siravyan (born 1973), illustrator, jewelry designer, theatrical costume creator
Lilit Soghomonyan (born 1969), painter

T
Lilit Teryan (1930–2019), sculptor
Arevik Tserunyan (born 1987), painter and draftperson
Armine Tumanyan (born 1975), painter
Nune Tumanyan (born 1963), sculptor, educator

U 
 Aytsemnik Urartu (1899–1974), sculptor

V 
 Knarik Vardanyan (1914–1996), Armenian Soviet painter and printmaker

See also 
 List of Armenian artists

References

-
Armenian women artists, List of
Artists
Artists